Masterpiece is a 2017 Indian Malayalam-language action mystery thriller film directed by Ajai Vasudev and written by Uday Krishna. It stars Mammootty in the title role, along with Unni Mukundan, Gokul Suresh, Mukesh, Maqbool Salmaan and John Kaippallil. The principal photography began on 17 April 2017 at the Fatima Mata National College, Kollam and was completed by the end of November in Kochi. Deepak Dev composed the music of the film. The film was released on 21 December 2017. It was the first instalment of Udaykrishna Cinematic Universe

Masterpiece released in above 250 screens and the movie got a gigantic opening at the Kerala box office. The makers of the film had confirmed that Masterpiece fetched
   on its very first day at the Kerala box office and went on to set a new opening day collection record.

Plot
In Travancore college in Kerala, two student groups named Real Fighters and Royal Warriors always quarrel over various issues. Simultaneously, a new student named Vedika joins their college and the groups war over who will win her over. When Vedika says she is in a relationship with Unnikrishnan, who is meek and introverted, the Real Fighters make Unnikrishnan a member of the group and asks him to reciprocate Vedika's feelings. One night, Unni is caught by police for drinking and driving, although he is released later without any charges. Vedika is found dead behind the men's hostel of the college, her father Shivanandan, a politician urges the police to find the killer at any cost.

The police under ACP John Thekkan IPS begin their investigation. Later, the investigation leads to Unnikrishnan, who received the last phone call from Vedika before her death. John Thekkan arrests Unnikrishnan forcefully and questions him. Later Unnikrishnan is found dead inside the police interrogation room. This leads to a quarrel between the police and the students in which John Thekken gets seriously injured and hospitalised. In his absence, The investigation is handed over to ACP Bhavani Durga. At the same time, a person named Edward Livingston aka Eddy joins the college as the new professor in English literature.

The ACP orders to arrest Roshan, who is the leader of Royal Warriors. This is because according to an evidence the murderer is observed to be nearly 6-ft tall and Roshan has a similar physique. This leads to yet another dispute between the police and the campus and the police is prevented by the Home minister from entering the campus. Professor Cherian, who is the college vice principal and also Roshan's father talks to Edward about his life as a divorcee. He tells Eddy that Roshan is innocent as he was at his mother's house at the night the murder happened. In a meeting between the police and campus, Eddy talks to the officials that the students are not responsible for the murder and also that the police is responsible for Unnikrishnan's death.

After few days, Shivanandan sends his goons to the college so that the suspected students can be handed over to police. But Eddy intervenes and thrashes the goons. He also unites the two student groups and fight them together. Later, new men are appointed in the college as workers in various department fields. Eddy closely watches their body language and understands that they are police officers. He warns the students not to leave the campus at any cost. Despite his warning, Roshan and his friends leave to attend a wedding reception, wherein they are spotted by the police. John Thekkan, who is back on duty apprehends them and gets hold of Roshan, while his friends escape. Roshan is taken to a hideout, but Eddy and team tracks them and saves Roshan.

Eddy and the students promise to the police and media that they will find out the murderers of Vedika and Unnikrishnan within 10 days. Eddy asks Roshan to reunite his parents, who have been separated, which he does. Roshan's friend Mahesh tells the team that his girlfriend Ramlath is being forced by her family for an alliance which she doesn't like. He goes to meet Ramlath, but is arrested by police and Ramlath is taken to custody by SI Ramachandran, who is John Thekkan's close friend. Ramlath is forcefully taken to his guest house where Eddy saves her by defeating Ramachandran. Eddy finds out that it was John Thekkan, who murdered Vedika and later instructed Ramachandran to murder Unnikrishnan.

John had a grudge against Vedika as she along with her Ramlath discovered John Thekkan's illegal relationship with Minister Seethalakshmi, who is the wife of a deceased politician Krishnadas. It is revealed that Krishnadas was murdered by Thekkan and Ramachandran when he found out his wife's extramarital relationship with Thekkan, who was raised by him. Ramlath who understood all these informed Vedika about the same and Vedika, who wanted to inform Unni about the incident was kidnapped and killed by Thekkan and Ramachandran. Unnikrishnan was arrested on purpose and was killed as Thekkan understood Unni had known certain facts about Vedika's death. After Ramachandran reveals all these to the public, he is shot and killed by Thekkan who tries to escape, but Eddy overpowers and kills Thekkan with his pistol.

Later, Cherian along with Roshan and Mahesh leave for the police station to see Eddy. However, they are shocked to see that the real Edward Livingston, eager on knowing about Eddy's identity, Cherian and students learn that Edward Livingstone is himself revealed to be an IPS officer named Anto Antony from the Central Home Department and also that the police disguised as workers in the college, were actually his teammates.

Cast

Mammootty as Professor Edward Livingstone (fake) / DIG Anto Antony IPS (in real)
Unni Mukundan as ACP John Thekkan 
Mukesh  as Vice Principal Cherian Philip
Maqbool Salmaan as Mahesh Raman
John Kaipallil as Roshan Cherian
Gokul Suresh as Unnikrishnan
Kalabhavan Shajohn as SI Ramachandran
Varalaxmi Sarathkumar as ACP Bhavani Durga IPS
Poonam Bajwa as Smitha, a lecturer
Mahima Nambiar as Vedika
Lena as Minister Seethalakshmi Krishnadas
Santhosh Pandit as Sankarankutty
Neeraja S Das as Ramlath
Kailash as CI Raja Ravi Varma
Arjun Nandhakumar as Gokul Das
Divyadarshan as Deepan
Ameer Niyaz as Jithu
Joji as Dinu
Aswin Menon as College Student
Sunil Sukhada as Principal Narayana Pillai
Vijayakumar as Professor Kurian Thomas 
Sadiq as City Police Commissioner Arun Dev IPS
Nandhu as Balan Master, Unnikrishnan's father
Shivaji Guruvayoor as Party President Shivanandan
Manju Satheesh as Lekshmi, Unnikrishnan's mother
Bijukuttan as Reji
Saju Navodaya as Canteen Mani
Baiju.V.K. as Krishnakumar, Professor
Janardhanan as Chief Minister 
Ponnamma Babu as Sister Jaseentha
Rosshan Chandra as Vedika's brother 
Megha Mathew as Athira 
Remya Panickar 
Captain Raju as Himself (extended special appearance)
Renji Panicker as Edward Livingstone (Original), (Cameo Appearance)
Divya Pillai as ASP Sreedevi IPS, Anto's subordinate (cameo appearance)
Uday Krishna in a cameo appearance 
Sanju Sivram in a cameo appearance in the song "Dinam Dinam"
Manikkuttan in a cameo appearance in the song "Mylanchi"
Anjali Nair in a cameo appearance in the song "Mylanchi"
Nithin Renji Panicker (cameo)
Tomichan Mulakuppadam (cameo)
Vysakh (cameo)

Production

Development
In October 2016, Uday Krishna stated that his next screenplay, features Mammootty as a lecturer and would be directed by Ajai Vasudev, and it would be set at the backdrop of a college campus. The film was announced in February 2017 at a ceremony held in Dubai by producer C. H. Muhammed as his debut production venture. In July 2017, film's title was confirmed as Masterpiece. According to Ajay Vasudev, the plot is "something happens in the college and that's what Masterpiece is all about."

Casting
By February 2017, actors Mukesh, Maqbool Salmaan, Kalabhavan Shajohn, Arjun Nandhakumar, Kailash, and John Kaipallil were confirmed to be in cast, while Unni Mukundan was hired by Ajai Vasudev to an important role, though he had not officially signed at the time. Mukesh was reported to appear in a role of vice principal at the college, while Unni Mukundan's character was confirmed to be not a student. Regarding the character of Mammootty, Ajai Vasudev said, "He plays a strict college professor who doesn't mollycoddle his students, a rough and tough character with a short temper. The characterisation is very much on the lines of the larger-than-life roles." After the character was just described by Ajai to Mammootty, he liked it very much and himself chose the appearance and developed the characteristics.

In April 2017, Gokul Suresh Maqbool Salmaan, John Kaippallil and Santhosh Pandit were confirmed in prominent roles. Pandit allotted one month date. In the same month, Varalaxmi Sarathkumar, Poonam Bajwa and Mahima Nambiar was confirmed in the female leads. According to Ajai Vasudev, "All three actresses have important roles in the film." Uday Krishna revealed that Varalaxmi would play an IPS officer Bhavani Durga and Poonam Bajwa a lecturer. None of the actresses is as a love interest for the hero, as the plot lacks such a thread. Captain Raju also plays a role.

Filming
The principal photography was commenced on 17 April 2017. Unni Mukundan joined on that day. The films's action was coordinated by 6 stunt coordinatorsKanal Kannan, Jolly Bastian, Stunt Silva, Sirthai Ganesh, and Mafia Sasi, to minimize the similar pattern of stunts in the film. Set in Kollam city, film's first schedule was shot at the Fatima Mata National College. Mammootty joined on 10 May. Fight scenes were filmed at the college in 12 days. Poonam Bajwa was part of the college scenes. Second schedule began in early July, shot mainly at a location in Calicut. Mammootty rode a Harley-Davidson Street motorcycle for a scene that was shot on a day in late August. Final schedule of filming began in November and Mammootty's action scenes were shot in Kochi in three days. Then the team moved again to Kollam where a five days filming was planned. Filming concluded in November end in Kochi, with some crucial scenes in the movie shot there in final days. Filming took place in more than 115 days.

Release
The film was released on 21 December 2017. On the release it was dubbed in Tamil as Perasiriyar Chanakyan and it was released in 2019 in Tamilnadu. It was also dubbed in Hindi as Dashing Jigarwala 2. The satellite rights of that version went to Mazhavil Manorama. The Tamil dubbed version was premiered on Polimer TV on the day of the Pongal festival. The satellite rights to the Hindi dubbed version went to Star Gold. The film also has a Kannada dubbed version under the title Professor. In 2021, It was also Dubbed and released in Telugu as Great Shankar in 2021 was also box office success.

Box office
The film was a commercial success. The film became the first-ever Mollywood movie to be dubbed in Russian. Masterpiece had a release in UAE/GCC regions on January 4, 2017. Reportedly, the movie released in 68 screens across UAE/GCC and the Mammootty starrer was off to a flying start. There are also reports that Masterpiece has crossed the 2K shows count at UAE/GCC regions.
 The film collected ₹ 5.11 crore from its first day and ₹ 13.54 crore from 3 days from Kerala box office. The film collected ₹5 crore from Tamil Nadu box office, which made it highest grossing Malayalam film in Tamil Nadu, which was broken by Dulquer's film Kurup in 2021. It is running in 103 screens and has crossed the 13k shows mark in the theatres. The film collected around ₹40 crore from worldwide box office in its final run.

Critical reception
The film received mixed reviews from the critics. The Times of India rated the movie 3.25/5 and concluded that the film falls flat at many areas and fails as a festive commercial release. Sify rated the film 3/5 and concluded film as a masala entertainer. The Hindu cited that the film is an excuse for hero (Mammootty) worship. The Indian Express went on to say that the film is yet another wrong decision by Mammootty.

Music
"Master of the Masses" - Jack Styles
"Madhu Mozhi" - Madhu Balakrishnan
"Mylanchi" - Jassie Gift, Chorus
"Wake Up" - Jyotsna, Haricharan
"Dinam Dinam" - Rony Philip
"Kaalam Poyeettum" - Jassie Gift
"Mele (Promo Song)" - P. M. Shan

References

External links

Films shot in Kollam
Films shot in Kochi
Films shot in Kozhikode
Indian action comedy films
Films scored by Deepak Dev
2010s Malayalam-language films
Films set in Kerala
2017 crime thriller films
2017 crime drama films
Films set in universities and colleges
Fictional portrayals of the Kerala Police
2010s police procedural films
2010s political drama films
2010s political thriller films
Indian action drama films
Indian thriller drama films
Indian mystery drama films
Indian crime drama films
Films about teacher–student relationships
Films directed by Ajai Vasudev